The Santa Barbara International Marathon and Half Marathon is a road race in Southern California. The race was first run in 1965 and was one of the first marathons in California. Since Santa Barbara itself is a popular tourist destination, it is also becoming a popular destination marathon.
The point-to-point marathon course currently start at Dos Pueblos High School in Goleta and finish at Santa Barbara City College in Santa Barbara, California. The marathon race can be used to obtain a qualifying time for the Boston Marathon.

After a break of 24 years, the new series began on December 6, 2009. For the last five years the Santa Barbara City College has been the official host for the finish line and general operations. Rusty and June Snow are the co-directors of the race with Dan Campbell as the technical director. The Snow's moved from the East Coast and wanted to bring a marathon to Santa Barbara. After a few years of getting the race approved and organized it was finally set to happen in 2009, Rusty Snow states, “I learned to be stubborn from running marathons.” The Santa Barbara International Marathon course serves as a Boston Marathon qualifier.

Course
The races begins in Goleta, California. The runners follow the roads through the Goleta area, travel toward the outskirts of Isla Vista, the college town of the University of California Santa Barbara and twist and turn through residential areas. The runners make their way toward the heart of Santa Barbara and face a significant incline near the end of the race. Once the athletes conquer the hill there is downhill slope with the Pacific Ocean in full view as they head into the Santa Barbara City College stadium.

History
The original Santa Barbara marathon took place from 1965 to 1984.  A group of distance runners created the event. During this time frame in the United States, only five annual marathons were up and running.  In 1965, twenty seven individuals started the race, which began at the University of California Santa Barbara and ended at the Santa Barbara City College, where seventeen runners finished the race.  The following year, the City College served as the start and finish line. During the race, there were no aid stations and runners did not have the roads blocked off to prevent vehicle traffic. In 1977, there were a total of 354 runners, but the number of participants began to decline, and the event eventually ended as runners were attracted to other more popular marathons.

2009
The inaugural race took place on December 6, 2009. 1,686 marathon participants crossed the finish line and another 300 finishers crossed the line for the marathon relay event. Carlos Handler was the overall winner with a time of 2:24:48.7. Andrea McLarty was the first woman finisher with a time of 2:52:23.6.

2010
The race took place on December 5, 2010.  998 marathon finishers crossed the line which is a lower amount than the previous year, a majority of the racers, 2,297, participated in the half marathon. Moniwda Marube was the overall winner of the marathon with a time of 2:25:49. The first woman to cross the finish line was Liz Gottlieb with a time of 3:01:07. Andrea McLarty who won the marathon for the women in 2009 finished as the first female in the half marathon with a time of 1:21:06. There was a course change this year as well, runners no longer finish outside of the Santa Barbara City College stadium, they now enter the stadium and finish with a three-quarters lap around the track.

2011
After two years of the race operating in December it was moved to November. The race occurred on November 12, 2011. Moninda Marube won the overall event for the second year in a row breaking the course record with a time of 2:22:28.  For the women, Laura Turner was the first female crossing the line with a time of 3:03:27.

2012
The marathon took place on November 10, 2012. The winner of the 2012 marathon was Abraham Kogo with a time of 2:23:10.6. Following Kogo was Scott Downard of Oklahoma with a time of 2:28:19.1. A Colorado woman, Paige Higgins finished with a time of 2:48:35 which is four minutes faster than the course record for women, the record was previously held by Andrea McLarty. Higgins was the seventh individual to cross the marathon finish line overall. There were 5,064 individuals that finished the marathon, half marathon and marathon relay in total, which was an increase from the previous year.

In 2012, the New York City Marathon was cancelled due to the destruction of Hurricane Sandy. The race directors offered a discount to participate in the Santa Barbara International Marathon and Half Marathon to those that were scheduled to run the New York City Marathon.

Philanthropy
In 2009, co-directors Rusty and June Snow gathered leftover water bottles and bars and gave them to the local Santa Barbara Foodbank. Any clothing that was left on the course was donated to the Unity Shoppe.

In 2011, the race directors donated one dollar from each participants' registration fee to give to the Community Environmental Council which totaled a five thousand dollar donation. Rusty Snow, one of the race directors made this statement about partnering with this organization, “We need to be thoughtful and protect that place we live and run. One reason people come to run the marathon is to experience the beauty of the region. We want to protect that for years to come, for our runners and for our community.”

Marathon Winners  

Key:

References

External links 
 Official Website
 Santa Barbara Half Marathon, an event dating from 2021

Marathons in California
Marathons in the United States
Foot races in California
Sports in Santa Barbara County, California
Goleta, California
Santa Barbara, California